Slaithwaite , locally Slawit  (Old Norse: Timber-fell clearing), is a village within the Metropolitan Borough of Kirklees, in West Yorkshire, England. The village has two primary schools; Slaithwaite Church of England School on Holme Lane and Nields Junior, Infant and Nursery School on Nields Road. There is also a small primary school in the nearby hamlet of Wilberlee. The village is serviced by the local Secondary School,  Colne Valley High School in Linthwaite approximately 2.5 miles away. The village was voted the best place to live in the North & Northeast in The Times 2022 Best Places To Live annual guide.

History

Between 1195 and 1205, Roger de Laci, Constable of Chester, gave the manor of Slaithwaite to Henry Teutonicus (Lord Tyas). It remained in the Tyas family until the end of the 14th century when it came into the Kaye family. It eventually joined the estates of the Earl of Dartmouth, a descendant of the Kayes, and was part of the upper division of the wapentake of Agbrigg. It included the township of Lingarths (Lingards) and constituted the Chapelry of Slaithwaite, in the Patronage of the Vicar of Huddersfield.

In the early 19th century, a local spring was discovered to contain sulphurous properties and minerals, similar to those found in Harrogate. Sometime after 1820 a bathing facility was built, along with a gardens and pleasure ground, with some visitor cottages. A free school was founded in 1721 and rebuilt twice: first in 1744, and again in 1842.

In the 1848 edition of A Topographical Dictionary of England, Samuel Lewis (the editor) wrote:
"the lands are in meadow and pasture, with a small portion of arable; the scenery is bold and romantic. In the quarries of the district are found vegetable fossils, especially firs and other mountain trees. The village is beautifully seated in the valley of the river Colne; the inhabitants are chiefly employed in the woollen manufacture, in the spinning of cotton and silk, and in silk-weaving"

Slaithwaite Hall, thought to date from the mid-15th century, is located on a nearby hillside. It is one of a number of cruck-framed buildings clustered in this area of West Yorkshire. After many years divided into cottages, the building has been extensively restored and is now a single dwelling.

Legend has it that local smugglers caught by the excise men tried to explain their nocturnal activities as 'raking the moon from the canal' and definitely not as 'fishing out smuggled brandy'. A "Moonraker" is now the nickname for a native of the village. Similar stories and nicknames exist for the neighbouring villages of Golcar ("Lillies"), Marsden ("Cuckoos") and Linthwaite ("Leadboilers"). The legend is also known in Wiltshire, where the locals are also known as 'Moonrakers'.

An apocryphal story associated with Slaithwaite is that in the 19th century, when tenants came to the village to pay their annual rent, The 5th Earl of Dartmouth would provide 'rent dinners' and that the shoulder of mutton was the most favoured with the tables of hot roast beef, mutton and tongue (cooked together in the set pot) being available there at that time.

The Old Town Hall in Lewisham Road served as the municipal headquarters of successive local authorities in the area until the abolition of Colne Valley Urban District Council in 1974.

Economy
Recent projects have seen a major restoration of the canal. That required a full re-excavation and new lock gates. Following the emergence of the railway network they were little used and closed down then filled in during 1956. The refurbishment has revitalised the high street area and Slaithwaite is currently the only village in England with a canal running alongside its main street.

There are several significant local employers, including Thornton & Ross (a pharmaceuticals manufacturer), Shaw Pallets and Spectrum Yarns – one of a small number of remaining textiles businesses in the Colne Valley, once a major centre for wool and yarn.

Churches
The church of St James in Slaithwaite is the parish church; it is grouped with St Bartholomew's in Marsden and the mission church at Shred. The present church stands on high ground and was constructed c. 1789 to replace the original church which had suffered from flooding. There is also a Methodist church.

Shopping and entertainment

There are several traditional public houses in Slaithwaite, including the Commercial, the Shoulder of Mutton, and the 'Silent Woman' which came to the attention of the world media on 23 September 2007, when a man walked into the pub and ordered a pint of beer a few minutes after he had murdered his son and attacked his daughter with a knife.  Alternative dining and drinking venues are the Little Bridge, Vanilla Bean, and Om Is Where The Heart Is. The village is included as one of the stops in the Transpennine Real Ale Trail, and the Commercial is the recommended pub.

Slaithwaite has a vibrant centre with many independent shops, a post office, restaurants and cafes. Other shops include the community-owned cooperative the 'Green Valley Grocer', the workers' cooperative the 'Handmade Bakery,' and Mystical Moments – which hit national headlines in August 2016 as the Magic Wand shop'.

Transport

More modern transport is provided by the Slaithwaite railway station, which has direct trains to Huddersfield and Manchester. The Colne Valley defines local geography by channelling the railway line, the canal and the A62: each of which has at one time been the primary means of transport across the Pennines. The small humpbacked bridge over the canal is called 'Tim Brig'; it is said to be named after a local inn keeper who used the bridge during smuggling operations with the narrowboats passing through.

There are several bus links from Slaithwaite to several places in the Huddersfield area. Services run by First West Yorkshire go from Slaithwaite to Marsden, Oldham and Manchester and to Huddersfield. Other bus services are to Holmfirth, Blackmoorfoot and surrounding villages.

Culture
In February, on alternate years, Slaithwaite celebrates a 19th-century legend of Moonraking with the Slaithwaite Moonraking Festival, with a week of lantern making and a programme of storytelling. The week-long celebration, which always takes place during the school half term week, ends with a parade of lanterns around the village, and a festival finale by the canal in the centre of the village. A heritage lottery funded project 'Wild about Wool', that is collating memories of the industrial heritage of the Colne Valley, is linked to the festival. 'Wool' was also the theme of the festival held in February 2011.

The Slaithwaite Philharmonic Orchestra was founded here in 1891. An 80-strong amateur orchestra, the orchestra also plays an annual season of concerts in Huddersfield.

Slaithwaite Brass Band have been making music here since 1892. They perform at many concerts and events throughout the year and have had many successes over the years including being the first band to gain the Grand Shield twice.

Parts of both Slaithwaite and Marsden were used to create the village called 'Skelthwaite' in the British TV show Where the Heart Is.

Sport
Cricket is very popular in the village. Slaithwaite Cricket & Bowling Club, situated on Hill Top, during the summer becomes the heart of the community. It is a thriving club with many successful teams including winning Second XI Premiership Championship in the 2010 season. The village also has its own running club named Slaithwaite Striders, which has a mixture of all abilities, meeting weekly to run and enjoy the surrounding roads, paths and of course the views.

Notable people born in Slaithwaite
William Crowther, Mayor of Auckland, born at Slaithwaite-cum-Lingards, 1832.
Haydn Wood, (composer) was born here on 25 March 1882.

See also
Listed buildings in Colne Valley (central area)

References

Further reading
Charles Augustus Hulbert Annals of the Church in Slaithwaite 1864.
--do.--Extracts from the diary of ... Robert Meeke, founder of the Slaithwaite free school in 1721. To which are added notes, illustr. and a brief sketch of his life by H. J. Morehouse. Also a continuation of the history of Slaithwaite free school by C. A. Hulbert 1875.

External links

St James, Slaithwaite (Church of England)

Villages in West Yorkshire
Geography of Huddersfield
Colne Valley